Roger-Louis Loeuillet is a French philatelist who was added to the Roll of Distinguished Philatelists in 1989.

Loeuillet has won the Grand Prix at Paris in 1964 and in London in 1970 for his displays of stamps and has edited and published the Ceres catalogues of France, French Colonies and Monaco.

References

Signatories to the Roll of Distinguished Philatelists
French philatelists
Living people
Year of birth missing (living people)